DYRM (1134 AM) Radyo Pilipino is a radio station owned and operated by Radyo Pilipino Media Group through its licensee Philippine Radio Corporation. Its studios and transmitter are located at Brgy. Calindagan, Dumaguete. DYRM is the pioneer AM station in Negros Oriental.

It was formerly owned by Allied Broadcasting Center from its inauguration until 1983, when the Radio Corporation of the Philippines acquired the station. Based on a survey conducted by Kantar in early 2017, it is ranked #2 most listened to AM station.

References

Radio stations in Dumaguete
Radio stations established in 1959